Santa Singh (born 11 February 1996) is an Indian field hockey player who plays as a Midfielder. He was part of the Indian squad that won Gold at 2016 Men's Hockey Junior World Cup in Lukhnow, India.

References

External links 
 Player profile at Hockey India

1996 births
Living people
People from Haryana
Indian male field hockey players
Field hockey players from Haryana